Skull & Bones is a three-issue prestige format mini-series by Ed Hannigan published in 1991 by DC Comics.

Plot
Following the end of the Soviet Union occupation of Afghanistan, soldier Andrian Trofimovich Linov returns home with a plan to destabilise the government. However, faced with an impending genocide, he is forced to defend the very system he sought to tear down. With the assistance of his friends Elektrik Feliks and Nadejda Kosakhova, he must stop the release of a deadly bioweapon that will cause World War III.

1991 comics debuts
DC Comics limited series
DC Comics titles